Stade Balibiè is a multi-use stadium in Koudougou, Burkina Faso.  It is currently used mostly for football matches and is the home stadium of Association Sportive des Employés et Commerçants de Koudougou. The stadium holds 5,000 people.

Balibie